Platensina zodiacalis is a species of tephritid or fruit flies in the genus Platensina of the family Tephritidae.

Distribution
Sri Lanka, Nepal to Laos, Malaysia, Philippines, Indonesia , North Australia.

References

Tephritinae
Taxa named by Mario Bezzi
Insects described in 1913
Diptera of Asia